"No Hope" is a song from London-based quartet The Vaccines. The track was released in the United Kingdom on 8 July 2012 as the lead single from the band's second studio album, Come of Age (2012). "No Hope" received its first play on 28 May 2012 when it featured as BBC Radio 1 DJ Zane Lowe's Hottest Record in the World. A four-track extended play was made available to pre-order shortly afterwards, including the B-side "Blow Your Mind" which was written and sung by bass player Arni Hjorvar to tie in with the artwork which depicts a young girl resembling him.

Track listing

Charts

Release history

References

2012 singles
The Vaccines songs
2012 songs
Columbia Records singles